The Bulgarian Women's Basketball Cup is an annual cup competition for Bulgarian women's basketball clubs founded in 1951, six years after the national championship. Levski Sofia is the most successful team in the competition with 13 titles between 1969 and 1991, followed by Slavia Sofia with ten, WBC Montana with seven, Neftokhimik Burgas with six and Akademik Sofia and Minyor Pernik with five.

List of champions

 1951 Lokomotiv Sofia
 1952 Slavia Sofia
 1953 Slavia Sofia
 1954 Lokomotiv Sofia
 1955 Slavia Sofia
 1956 Slavia Sofia
 1957 Akademik Sofia
 1960 Akademik Sofia]
 1962 NSA Sofia
 1963 NSA Sofia
 1965 Lokomotiv Sofia
 1966 Slavia Sofia
 1967 Akademik Sofia
 1968 Lokomotiv Sofia
 1969 Levski Sofia
 1970 Slavia Sofia
 1971 Slavia Sofia
 1972 Levski Sofia
 1973 Akademik Sofia
 1974 Levski Sofia

 1975 Akademik Sofia
 1976 Levski Sofia
 1977 Levski Sofia
 1978 Minyor Pernik
 1979 Minyor Pernik
 1980 Levski Sofia
 1981 Minyor Pernik
 1982 Levski Sofia
 1983 Levski Sofia
 1984 Slavia Sofia
 1985 Levski Sofia
 1986 Levski Sofia
 1987 Levski Sofia
 1988 Minyor Pernik
 1989 Levski Sofia
 1990 Minyor Pernik
 1991 Levski Sofia
 1992 Kremikovtsi
 1993 Kremikovtsi
 1994 Septemvri Sofia

 1995 Montana
 1996 Maritsa Plovdiv
 1997 Montana
 1998 Montana
 1999 Neftokhimik Burgas
 2000 Montana
 2001 Slavia Sofia
 2002 Akademik Plovdiv
 2003 Slavia Sofia
 2004 Neftokhimik Burgas
 2005 Neftokhimik Burgas
 2006 Neftokhimik Burgas
 2007 CSKA Sofia
 2008 Neftokhimik Burgas
 2009 Montana
 2010 Dunav Ruse
 2011 Dunav Ruse
 2012 Dunav Ruse
 2013 Dunav Ruse
 2014 Montana

 2015 Neftokhimik Burgas
 2016 Montana
 2017 Haskovo 2012
 2018 Montana
 2019 Montana
 2020 Beroe
 2021 Beroe

References

External links

Cup
Recurring sporting events established in 1951
Women's basketball cup competitions in Europe